Groove Merchant was an American jazz and R&B record label during the 1970s. It was run by producer Sonny Lester and distributed by Pickwick Records. Notable artists included Chick Corea, O'Donel Levy, Buddy Rich, Jimmy McGriff, Lonnie Smith and Lionel Hampton. Lester would later close Groove Merchant and restructure it as Lester Radio Corporation, or LRC; TK Records were distributors for a period. Lester still retains the rights to the Groove Merchant/LRC back catalog and independently distributes them on compact disc.

Discography

500 Series
The Groove Merchant 500 Series consisted of 34 albums released between 1971 and 1974.

2200 Series
The 2200 Series, released in 1972, consisted of five albums which feature previously released and/or unissued material produced by Sonny Lester for various other labels.

3300 Series
The 3300 Series consisted of sixteen albums released between 1973 and 1976.

4000 Series
The 4000 Series, released in 1974–1975, consisted of twelve double LP compilations of previously issued material. 
 GM 4400 Lionel Hampton: The Works! (material later released as the single LPs: Hamp's Big Band Live! on Glad-Hamp, and Good Vibes on 51 West/CBS)
 GM 4401 Carmen McRae: Velvet Soul (compiles It Takes a Whole Lot of Human Feeling and Ms. Jazz)
 GM 4402 Groove Holmes: Hunk–a–Funk (compiles Night Glider and New Groove)
 GM 4403 Jimmy McGriff: Flyin' Time (compiles Fly Dude and Let's Stay Together)
 GM 4404 Reuben Wilson: Bad Stuff! (compiles The Sweet Life and The Cisco Kid)
 GM 4405 Various Artists: Blues in Concert (compiles selections from Jimmy McGriff/Junior Parker, Very Live at Buddy's Place, Concert: Friday the 13th - Cook County Jail, Giants of the Organ in Concert, plus two live tracks by Dakota Staton) 
 GM 4406 Chick Corea / Mike Longo: Piano Giants (compiles Sundance and Funkia)
 GM 4407 Buddy Rich: Tuff Dude! (compiles The Roar of '74 and Very Live at Buddy's Place)
 GM 4408 O'Donel Levy: Hands of Fire (compiles Black Velvet and Simba)
 GM 4409 Jimmy McGriff and Groove Holmes: Supa Cookin'  (compiles Giants of the Organ Come Together and the first LP from the Giants of the Organ in Concert 2LP set) 
 GM 4410 Dakota Staton: Confessin'  (compiles Madame Foo-Foo and I Want a Country Man)
 GM 4411 Lucky Thompson: Illuminations (compiles Goodbye Yesterday and I Offer You)

References

External links
 Official website for LRC-Groove Merchant Records

Jazz record labels